Eckhard Meinrenken  is a German-Canadian mathematician working in differential geometry and mathematical physics. He is a professor at University of Toronto.

Education and career 

He was a postdoc at Massachusetts Institute of Technology from 1995 to 1997, and then he joined University of Toronto Department of Mathematics in 1998 as assistant professor. In 2000 he become Associated Professor and since 2004 he is Full Professor at the same university.

Meinrenken was awarded in 2001 an André Aisenstadt Prize, in 2003 a McLean Award and in 2007 a NSERC Steacie Memorial Fellowship.

In 2002 he was invited speaker at the International Congress of Mathematicians in Beijing and in 2008 he was elected Fellow of the Royal Society of Canada.

Research 
Meinrenken's research interests lie in the fields of differential geometry and mathematical physics. In particular, he works on symplectic geometry, Lie theory and Poisson geometry.

Among his most important contributions, in 1998 he proved, together with Reyer Sjamaar the conjecture "quantisation commutes with reduction", originally formulated in 1982 by Guillemin and Sternberg. In the same year, together with Anton Alekseev and Anton Malkin, he introduced Lie group-valued moment maps in symplectic geometry.

Meinrenken is author of more than 50 research papers in peer-reviewed journals, as well as a monograph on Clifford algebras. He has supervised 9 PhD students as of 2021.

References

Living people
Canadian mathematicians
Academic staff of the University of Toronto
Year of birth missing (living people)
University of Freiburg alumni
Fellows of the Royal Society of Canada